The International Boxing Association (IBA), previously known as the Association Internationale de Boxe Amateur (AIBA), is an independent sport organization that sanctions amateur (Olympic-style) boxing matches and awards world and subordinate championships. IBA consists of five continental confederations — AFBC, AMBC, ASBC, EUBC, OCBC. The association includes 203 national boxing federations.

The IBA was recognised by the International Olympic Committee (IOC) as the international governing body for the sport of boxing until 2019, when the IOC suspended its recognition of the federation.

Names
 from August 24, 1920 — the International Federation of Amateur Boxers (Fédération Internationale de Boxe Amateur, FIBA);
 from November 28, 1946 — Amateur International Boxing Association, AIBA;
 On November 22, 2007, as part of the AIBA reform, the name was changed to the current one, — International Boxing Association – but the abbreviated name was decided to remain the same.
In December 2021, the abbreviated name was changed to IBA in an attempt to rebrand the organisation and distance itself from the former administration.

Competitions
Under the leadership of President Wu Ching-kuo, who ran AIBA from 2006 to 2017, the organization divided its competitions into three categories as part of Wu's overarching goal to govern boxing in all its forms:
 AIBA Open Boxing (AOB), formerly known as amateur or Olympic boxing
 AIBA Pro Boxing (APB), a professional boxing league
 World Series of Boxing (WSOB), a semi-professional team tournament
 
Wu's two professional ventures were abandoned by AIBA largely due to the organization's financial woes, which led to Wu's resignation in November 2017. AIBA Pro Boxing staged bouts only from late 2014 to 2016, and the World Series of Boxing abruptly ceased operations amid mounting financial losses after its 2018 season.

History

During the 1920 Summer Olympics in Antwerp, representatives from the national associations of England, France, Belgium, Brazil and the Netherlands met in a preliminary consortium for the foundation of an international boxing federation: The Fédération internationale de boxe amateur (FIBA). The official foundation has been celebrated on 24 August. Right after, international competitions appeared in the boxing arena, allowing amateurs to compete in well-known tournaments.
 
In November 1946, a consensus was met to give way for the boxing governing body to regain the loss of credibility due to the behavior of some leading officials in World War II. The FIBA was dissolved and the English Amateur Boxing Association in partnership with the French Boxing Federation decided to create AIBA; the Association Internationale de Boxe Amateur. The President of the French Boxing Federation, Emile Grémaux, was elected to the position of President.
 
Sixty years later, AIBA continued to govern boxing in the Olympic Games without using the word "amateur". Until now, amateur boxing has been present on all continents with continental championships as well as World Cups and World Championships organized by AIBA.
 
The organization has been involved in multiple corruption scandals including on several editions of the Summer Olympic Games. In December 2017, the International Olympic Committee (IOC) expressed concerns about the governance of AIBA under Wu's leadership, and reaffirmed these concerns at an IOC Executive Board decision in February 2018. In June 2019, the IOC voted to suspend its recognition of AIBA as the governing body for the sport, stripping AIBA of any involvement in the Olympic Games. The IOC oversaw the qualification events and the boxing tournament at the 2020 Olympic Games through a task force chaired by Morinari Watanabe (JPN), President of the International Gymnastics Federation.
 
On December 12, 2020, Umar Kremlev was elected as AIBA President, gaining 57.33% of the vote. The IOC had concerns, but Kremlev declared himself "the most clean candidate" and promised reforms. On December 13, 2020, AIBA adopted a new constitution. In 2021, Olympic champion, two-time World champion István Kovács was appointed General Secretary of AIBA. Later that year, AIBA appointed Professor Ulrich Haas to lead the AIBA's Independent Governance Reform Group.
 
Under the new leadership, five new committees were created: the Coaches Committee, the Champions and Veterans Committee, the Competition Committee, the Women's Committee, and the Medical and Anti-Doping Committee. In the process of Umar Kremlev's reforms, AIBA increased the number of weight categories in amateur boxing for men and women to 13 and 12, respectively. The prize money for the World Championships was set at $100,000 for gold medal, $50,000 for silver and $25,000 for both bronze medals. A program of financial assistance to national federations was also introduced.
 
On April 7, 2021, AIBA's new management signed a cooperation agreement with Gazprom, because of which the Russian company received the status of the organization's General Partner. AIBA stated they had paid off all debts, including a $10 million debt to the Azerbaijani company Benkons LLC. On May 28, 2021, AIBA signed an agreement with the international military sports council CISM. In the same year, the organization signed an agreement with the International Testing Agency (ITA).
 
To reveal the facts of manipulation at the boxing tournament at the Rio 2016 Olympic Games and corruption of the past AIBA administration, Canadian lawyer Professor Richard McLaren was appointed by AIBA to conduct a three-stage investigation. In September 2021, an independent report found that bouts leading up to and during the 2016 Rio Olympics were manipulated for money (up to $250,000), the perceived benefit of AIBA, or to thank National Federations, their Olympic committees, or hosts of competitions for their financial support and political backing. In December 2021, AIBA's National Federations implemented a series of constitutional amendments which included changing the abbreviated name to the IBA.

The International Olympic Committee has been concerned about the IBA under Kremlev's leadership. Kremlev has ties to Vladimir Putin, has moved much of the IBA's operations from Lausanne, Switzerland to Russia, has spent heavily on apparent self-promotion, and has opposed independent appointment of judges and referees. The IOC has also been alarmed by the fact that the IBA's only sponsor is a Russian company that supports the Russian invasion of Ukraine. In September 2022, the IBA voted against a presidential election, cementing Kremlev's position as the organization's president.

In late September, the IBA banned Ukraine's national federation, telling the Ukrainian junior boxing team they must compete under the IBA flag at the European championships in Italy. The International Olympic Committee (IOC) expressed serious concern over and stated it would conduct a full review about the decision in December. Ukrainian boxers refused to follow the requirements. On October 4, the IBA cancelled its previous decision and allowed Ukrainian boxers to compete under their flag. A day later, the IBA cancelled an IOC-imposed ban on boxers from Russia and Belarus from earlier that year in response to the Russian invasion of Ukraine. Russian and Belarusian boxers were allowed to compete with national flags and anthems in events with immediate effect. On October 6, Finland and Sweden announced that they would boycott IBA events with Russian or Belorussian boxers. In February 2023, USA Boxing announced its decision to boycott the 2023 World Championships (organized by the International Boxing Association) where Russian and Belarusian athletes will compete with no restrictions, also accusing the IBA of attempting to sabotage IOC-approved qualification pathway for the 2024 Summer Olympics. Poland, Switzerland, the Netherlands, Great Britain, Ireland, Czechia, Sweden and Canada later joined the U.S.

In November 2022, the IBA signed a cooperation agreement with the WBA.

Presidents
 Émile Grémaux (France), 1946–1959
 Lieutenant-Colonel Rudyard Russell (Great Britain), 1962–1978
 Colonel Don Hull (USA), 1978–1986
 Anwar Chowdhry (Pakistan), 1986–2006
 Kaner Doganeli (Turkey), 2006, act.p.
 Ching-Kuo Wu (Taiwan), 2006–2017
 Gafur Rakhimov (Uzbekistan), 2017–2019
 Mohamed Moustahsane (Morocco), 2019–2020, int.p.
 Umar Nazarovich Kremlev (Russia), 2020–present

Headguards
AIBA changed its rules in 2016 to ban headguards in AOB Elite Men competitions (19–40 years old) at the national, continental and international levels. Headguards are still mandatory for all other category competitions, including women's boxing at all levels. The Boxing Task Force for the Tokyo Olympics maintained the ban on headguards for men, but Roy Jones Jr. and other prominent boxers have argued for their reinstatement in future tournaments.

Events
 Olympic Games
 IBA World Boxing Championships
 Youth Olympic Games
 Youth and Junior World Boxing Championships
 Boxing World Cup (inactive)
 World Series Boxing (inactive)

See also
 Anwar Chowdhry
 Val Barker Trophy
 Boxing Association of Korea

References

External links
 
 

 
Amateur boxing organizations
Bo
Bo